Miss Tocantins is a Brazilian Beauty pageant which selects the representative for the State of Tocantins at the Miss Brazil contest. The pageant was created in 1989 and has been held every year since with the exception of 1990-1991, 1993, and 2020. The pageant is held annually with representation of several municipalities. Since 2021, the State director of Miss Tocantins is, Raffael Rodrigues. Tocantins has won only one crown in the national contest:

, from Patos de Minas, MG/Palmas, in 2003.

Results Summary

Placements
Miss Brazil:  (2003)
1st Runner-Up: 
2nd Runner-Up: 
3rd Runner-Up: Francielly de Oliveira Araújo (2005)
4th Runner-Up: 
Top 5/Top 8/Top 9: 
Top 10/Top 11/Top 12:  (1994); Camilla Christie Ribeiro Oliveira (2006); Suymara Barreto Parreira (2010); Alessandra Almeida (2019); Luciana Cirqueira Gomes (2021)
Top 15/Top 16: Islane Machado Rocha (2017)

Special Awards
Miss Photogenic: 
Best State Costume:

Titleholders
No delegates were sent between 1954-1988 as the contest didn't exist until 1989.

Table Notes

References

External links
Official Miss Brasil Website

Women in Brazil
Tocantins
Miss Brazil state pageants